Adam Pavlásek was the defending champion but chose not to defend his title.

Dalibor Svrčina won the title after defeating Dmitry Popko 6–0, 7–5 in the final.

Seeds

Draw

Finals

Top half

Bottom half

References

External links
Main draw
Qualifying draw

ATP Prague Open - 1
2021 Singles